The siege of Pizzighettone was the first major military engagement of the northern Italian campaigns of the War of the Polish Succession.  Troops from France and the Kingdom of Sardinia began blockading the Habsburg Milanese fortress at Pizzighettone on 11 November 1733, commencing siege operations on 15 November.  On 30 November the commander of the Austrian garrison negotiated a capitulation in which he promised to withdraw toward Mantua on 9 December if no relief arrived.  As no reinforcements appeared by that time, the fortress' garrison withdrew with full honors on 9 December.

References
 Military campaigns of Prince Eugene of Savoy, Volume 19 

Siege of Pizzighetone
Battles in Lombardy
Sieges involving France
Sieges involving Austria
Battles of the War of the Polish Succession
1733 in Europe
Duchy of Milan
Battles involving the Kingdom of Sardinia